The Renaissance Deputies, previously known as La République En Marche is a parliamentary group in the National Assembly of France including representatives of Renaissance after the 2017 legislative elections.

History 
On 24 June 2017, Richard Ferrand was elected president of the group with 306 votes and two abstentions. On 27 June, the group voted to designate François de Rugy its candidate for the president of the National Assembly, to be elected later that day; with a total of 301 votes cast, he collected 153 against 59 for Sophie Errante, 54 for Brigitte Bourguignon, 32 for Philippe Folliot, 2 blank votes, and 1 null vote. Pacôme Rupin, Coralie Dubost, Danièle Hérin, and Gilles Le Gendre were selected as the group's vice presidents; Aurore Bergé, Stanislas Guerini, Olivia Grégoire, and Hervé Berville as spokespersons; and Guillaume Gouffier-Cha and Stéphanie Do as treasurers. De Rugy was elected president of the National Assembly the same day, and former Prime Minister Manuel Valls also announced his intention to leave the Socialist Party and seek to affiliate with the LREM parliamentary group.

At the time of its formation on 27 June, the LREM parliamentary group included 313 deputies, including 4 associated members. Manuel Valls later joined the group as an associated member. On 5 September, M'jid El Guerrab quit the group and party after his assault of Socialist Boris Faure.

On 16 November, the Constitutional Council annulled the election of deputy Isabelle Muller-Quoy on 16 November 2017 under article L.O. 132 of the electoral code, and a by-election will subsequently be held in the constituency in 2018 to fill the vacant seat. After his exclusion from the Republicans and subsequent adhesion to La République En Marche, Thierry Solère left the constructives group for the La République En Marche group. On 8 December, the constitutional council annulled the election of Lénaïck Adam in French Guiana's 2nd constituency under article R42 of the electoral code, and a by-election will also be held in this constituency as a result. The invalidation of the election of Ramlati Ali on 19 January 2018 triggered another by-election, as was the case in the fifth constituency for French residents overseas, where the invalidation of the election of Samantha Cazebonne triggered another by-election.

List of presidents

Historical membership

See also 

Rally of Democrats, Progressive and Independent group (Senate)

References

External links 
 Notices and portraits of deputies 
 Changes in the composition of groups 

National Assembly (France)
Parliamentary groups in France
La République En Marche!